Van Foreest is the name of an aristocratic family that most probably originates from the region of Aachen, Germany, but is already found in the County of Holland in the 13th century. The family was already noble from earliest times ("Uradel"). In the early modern period, the family played a role in the city councils of Haarlem, Delft and Alkmaar. Members of the family are jonkheer.

Coat of arms

The Van Foreest coat of arms is depicted in the medieval Gelre Armorial (folio 85v).

Notable members
Arnold van Foreest (1863–1954), chess player
Dirk van Foreest (1862–1956), chess player
Jorden van Foreest (born 1999), chess player
Lucas van Foreest (born 2001), chess player
Machteld van Foreest (born 2007), chess player
Pieter van Foreest (1521–1597), physician

Gallery

Literature
H.A. van Foreest: Het oude geslacht Van Foreest, (Assen, 1950, - in Dutch).

References

Dutch noble families
German noble families
Dutch patrician families
Surnames